The Unknown Quantity was a 1919 American silent directed by Thomas R. Mills produced and distributed by the Vitagraph Company of America. It is based on the 1910  short story of the same name by O. Henry.

Plot

A profiteer's son falls in love with one of his father's victims and secures the acquittal of her brother who was falsely accused of murder.

Cast
 Corinne Griffith - Mary Boyne
 Huntley Gordon - Dan Kinsolving
 Harry Davenport - Septimus Kinsolving
 Jack Ridgeway - Thomas Boyne
 Frederick Buckley - Peter Kenwitz
 Jack McLean - Sammy Boyne

References

External links
 

American black-and-white films
Vitagraph Studios films
1919 films
American silent feature films
Lost American films
American silent short films
Adaptations of works by O. Henry
1910s American films